La Transfiguration de Notre Seigneur Jésus-Christ ("The Transfiguration of Our Lord Jesus Christ") is a work written between 1965 and 1969 by Olivier Messiaen. It is based on the account found in the synoptic gospels of Jesus' transfiguration. The writing is on a very large scale; the work requires around 200 performers. The forces required include a mixed choir, seven instrumental soloists and a large orchestra; only being surpassed by his opera Saint François d'Assise.

Background
On hearing "an old priest deliver a sermon on the light and the filiation", Messiaen started to think about the transfiguration story in the 1940s. By the time he began to write the music, he had not composed music for voices for 17 years, since his solo choral work Cinq rechants.  Warmer tonal harmonies reappeared in this work, in contrast to the harmonies he had been using for other works of the period.

Messiaen makes extensive use of birdsong throughout the piece, including the songs of the greater honeyguide, Alpine chough, accentor, superb starling, Baltimore oriole, rock thrush, blue mockingbird and peregrine falcon.

Performance history
The first public performance was on June 7, 1969, in Lisbon, Serge Baudo was the conductor. The United States premiere was on March 27–30, 1972 in Washington, DC with the National Symphony Orchestra and the Westminster Choir; Antal Dorati was the conductor. It was recorded the following month with Dorati conducting the same forces for Decca Records.

The US West Coast premiere was in 1981 in San Francisco, with the Berkeley Symphony and the Contra Costa Chorale under the direction of Kent Nagano. Preparation for this performance was supervised by Messiaen himself.

Structure
The music is divided into 14 movements, grouped into two septénaires (sets of seven), for about one and a half hours.  The texts are largely derived from the Bible, particularly Matthew's account of the Transfiguration. Also included are some parts of Thomas Aquinas's Summa Theologica.

First Septenary
 I. Récit évangélique (Gospel)
 II. Configuratum corpori claritatis suae (To be like his glorified body)
 III. Christus Jesus, splendor Patris (Jesus, reflection of the Father)
 IV. Récit évangélique (Gospel)
 V. Quam dilecta tabernacula tua (How lovely are your tabernacles)
 VI. Candor est lucis aeternae (She is the reflection of eternal light)
 VII. Choral de la sainte montagne (Chorale of the holy mountain)

Second Septenary
 VIII. Récit évangélique (Gospel)
 IX. Perfecte conscius perfectae generationis (Perfectly conscious of that perfect generation)
 X. Adoptionem filiorum perfectam (The perfect adoption of sons)
 XI. Récit évangélique (Gospel)
 XII. Terribilis est locus iste (How awesome is this place)
 XIII. Tota Trinitas apparuit (The whole Trinity appeared)
 XIV. Choral de la lumière de gloire (Chorale of the light of glory)

Instrumentation
It is scored for a mixed choir (10 voices per part), 7 instrumental soloists and a very large orchestra.

Woodwind: 2 piccolos, 3 flutes, 3 oboes, cor anglais, piccolo clarinet in E-flat, 3 clarinets, bass clarinet, 3 bassoons, contrabassoon
Brass: 6 horns, piccolo trumpet in D, 3 trumpets in C, 3 trombones, bass trombone, tuba, saxhorn, contrabass tuba
Soloists: flute solo, clarinet solo, xylorimba, vibraphone, marimba, cello solo, piano solo
Choir: 20 sopranos, 10 mezzos, 20 contraltos, 20 tenors, 10 baritones, 20 basses
Strings: 32 violins, 14 violas, 12 cellos, 10 double basses
Percussion: I: triangle, bells, güiro, 3 small Turkish cymbals, suspended cymbal, clash cymbals; II: crotales, claves, wood-block, 6 temple blocks, 1 pair of maracas, luminophone, clash cymbals; III: tubular bells; IV: 7 gongs; V: 3 tam-tams; VI: suspended cymbal, 3 toms, bass drum

Bibliography 
Bruhn, Siglind (2008). Messiaen's Interpretations of Holiness and Trinity: Echoes of Medieval Theology in the Oratorio, Organ Meditations, and Opera. Hillsdale, NY: Pendragon Press, pp. 67-110. ISBN 978-1-57647-139-5.
Dingle, Christopher (2007). The Life of Messiaen. Cambridge & New York: Cambridge University Press. .
Dingle, Christopher, & Nigel Simeone (eds) (2007). Olivier Messiaen: Music, Art and Literature. Aldershot: Ashgate. .
Samuel, Claude (tr. E. Thomas Glasow) (1994). Olivier Messiaen: Music and Color: Conversations with Claude Samuel. Portland, Oregon: Amadeus Press. .
Sherlaw Johnson, Robert (1975). Messiaen. Berkeley and Los Angeles: University of California Press. .

References

Deutsche Grammophon La Transfiguration CD Booklet
About the Music/Programme Notes—Olivier Messiaen (1908–92)—La Transfiguration de Notre Seigneur Jésus-Christ (1965–9), notes for Prom 14, BBC Proms 2008, 2008-07-27, Julian Anderson.  Retrieved 2008-07-28. 
Maas, Sander van. (2009). The Reinvention of Religious Music. Fordham University Press. .

Compositions by Olivier Messiaen
1969 compositions
Choral compositions
Compositions for symphony orchestra